Pietro Casati (12 October 1891 – 2 February 1956) was an Italian racing cyclist. He rode in the 1921 Tour de France.

References

1891 births
1956 deaths
Italian male cyclists
Place of birth missing